Sakya Trizin ( "Sakya Throne-Holder") is the traditional title of the head of the Sakya school of Tibetan Buddhism.

The Sakya school was founded in 1073CE, when Khön Könchog Gyalpo (1034–1102), a member of Tibet's noble Khön family, established a monastery in the region of Sakya, Tibet, which became the headquarters of the Sakya order. Since that time, its leadership has descended within the Khön family.

The 41st Sakya Trizin, whose reign spanned more than fifty years, was the longest reigning Sakya Trizin.  The current Sakya Trizin is Gyana Vajra Rinpoche, officially known as Kyabgon Gongma Trizin Rinpoche, the 43rd Sakya Trizin Gyana Vajra Rinpoche.

Origin of Khön
Lharig, the divine generation
According to legend Ciring descended from the Rupadhatu (Realm of Clear Light) to earth.
 Ciring
 Yuse
 Yuring
 Masang Cije
 Togsa Pawo Tag
 Tagpo Ochen
 Yapang Kye

Khön family, the royal generation
Because previous generations subjugated the rakshasas (demons), the family became the Family of Conquerors (shortened to Khön) and therefore a royal family.
 Khön Bar Kye
 Khön Jekundag, minister of Trisong Detsen, student of Padmasambhava
 Khön Lu'i Wangpo Srungwa
 Khön Dorje Rinchen
 Khön Sherab Yontan
 Khön Yontan Jungne
 Khön Tsugtor Sherab
 Khön Gekyab
 Khön Getong
 Khön Balpo
 Khön Shakya Lodro
 Sherab Tsultrim

Sakya Trizin Lineage

Sakya lineage, generations as Buddhist teachers.
 Khon Konchog Gyalpo founded the monastery in Sakya in 1073, and therefore the lineage was renamed Sakya.

New succession system

On 11 December 2014, a new throne holder succession system was announced during the 23rd Great Sakya Mönlam prayer festival on a resolution passed by the Dolma Phodrang and Phuntsok Phodrang, where members of both Phodrang will serve the role of Sakya Trizin in one three-year term, according to their seniority and qualification.

Ratna Vajra Rinpoche was enthroned on 9 March 2017 as the 42nd Sakya Trizin, the first to be enthroned under the new system. Due to the COVID Pandemic, the 43rd Sakya Trizin Gyana Vajra Rinpoche was enthroned on 16 March 2022, five years after the enthronement of the 42nd Sakya Trizin. He is the current throne holder of the Sakya school

Footnotes

References
 Penny-Dimri, Sandra. (1995). "The Lineage of His Holiness Sakya Trizin Ngawang Kunga." The Tibet Journal. Vol. XX, No. 4 Winter 1995, pp. 64–92. .
 Trizin, Sakya. Parting from the Four Attachments. Shang Shung Publications, 1999.

External links
 Sakya Dolma Phodrang's official website
 Hungarian website of Sakya Trizin including some information about Jetsun Kushok Chimey Luding see last section
 http://www.glorioussakya.org/history/hhst/
 https://treasuryoflives.org/en/institution/Sakya-Monastery#Abbots

 
Lamas
Sakya
Tulkus
Rinpoches